The Lords of Poederlee held a heerlijkheid (lordship) in Lille, Belgium, which in the 17th century became a barony.

Lords of Poederlee 
 Jean of Vriessele, Lord of Poederlee: married Margaretha van Haesbroeck.
 Gauthier of Vriessele, Lord of Poederlee, since 1433.
 Peter de Brimeu: married Magdalene of Vriessele, Lady of Poederlee
 Jacques de Brimeu, Lord of Poederlee: married Anna van de Werve, daughter of Martin.
 Jean de Brimeu, Lord of Poederlee: married Clara of Thuyl.
 Eleonora or Florentia de Brimeu, Lady of Poederlee: married Philip Snoy, Lord of Oppuers
 Philippe Snoy, Lord of Oppuers (1570–1637), knight. Married 1st Lady Marie de Brimeu, Lady of Poederlee.

Barons of Poederlé 
 Walburga Snoy, lady of Poederlee: married Philippe-Guillaume de Steenhuys, 1st Baron of Poederlee, in 1653. He was president of the Council of Flanders.
 Jean-Erard de Steenhuys, 2nd Baron of Poederlee.
 Marie Hélène de Steenhuys, 3rd Baron of Poederlee, married Eugène I d'Olmen.
 Philippe I d'Olmen, Baron of Poederlee
 Eugène II d'Olmen, Baron de Poederlé: President of the Great Council of Mechelen in 1739. Married Hyppolite-Françoise de Vicq, great-grand daughter of Henri de Vicq, Lord of Meuleveldt.
 Philippe II d'Olmen, Baron de Poederlé
 Hypolitte-Ernest d'Olmen, Baron de Poederlé
 Sélon d'Olmen was the last baron of Poederlé (1836–1898); he married Valentine de Jonghe d'Ardoye (1845–1896), but had no male heirs.

References

Lords of Belgium
Lists of Belgian nobility
Lille, Belgium